Twiste et Chante is the second studio album from French pop singer Sylvie Vartan. The music was conducted by Eddie Vartan for the Eddie Vartan et Son Orchestre.

Track listing
 "Twiste et chante" ("Twist and Shout") - (Phil Medley, Bert Russell) 
 "Les clous d'or"
 "Avec moi" ("So Long Baby")
 "Ne t'en vas pas" ("Coming Home Baby")
 "Mon ami" ("Where Do I Go") - (Gerry Goffin, Carole King; words adapted by Manou Roblin and Rudi Revil)
 "Je ne vois que toi" ("I'm Watching")
 "(I'm Watching) Every Little Move You Make"
 "En écoutant la pluie" ("Rhythm in the Rain")
 "Comm' tu es fou" ("I Got It")
 "Deux enfants"
 "Il faut choisir" ("It's Up to You")
 "Il revient" ("Say Mama")

References

1963 albums
French-language albums
Sylvie Vartan albums
RCA Records albums